The 1900 Latrobe Athletic Association season was their seventh season in existence. It was a low profile season for Latrobe. The team played in only 3 games this season and finished 2-1.

Schedule

Game notes

References

Latrobe Athletic Association
Latrobe Athletic Association seasons